Dial 100 is an Indian crime television series that aired on SAB TV. The series is produced by television actor Deepak Tijori.

Cast

Main 
 Abhimanyu Singh as Inspector Arjun Raina
 Murli Sharma as Inspector Vijay Naik
 Kainaaz Parvez as Inspector Avni Sharma

Episodic Appearances 
 Ajay Trehan (Episode 6 to Episode 8)
 Amit Singh Thakur as 
 (Episode 9 to Episode 12) 
 (Episode 29 to Episode 32)
 Chetanya Adib (Episode 9 & Episode 10)
 Deepak Dutta (Episode 9 to Episode 12)
 Jaydutt Vyas as 
 (Episode 9 to Episode 12)
 (Episode 23)
 Pradeep Kabra (Episode 11 & Episode 12)
 Vicky Ahuja (Episode 13 to Episode 16)
 Ashwin Kaushal (Episode 13 to Episode 16)
 Prakash Ramchandani (Episode 13 to Episode 16)
 Rajesh Dubey (Episode 13 & Episode 16)
 Indira Krishnan (Episode 14)
 Nikhil Diwan (Episode 15 & Episode 16)
 Ravi Gossain as Ranveer Sharma (Episode 17 to Episode 20)
 Tanushree Kaushal (Episode 17 to Episode 20)
 Neelu Kohli as Kavita Ranveer Sharma (Episode 17 & Episode 20)
 Firdaus Mevawala (Episode 17)
 Bakul Thakkar as 
 Ajay Khanna (Episode 21 to Episode 24)
 Mohit Sharma (After Plastic Surgery) (Episode 21 to Episode 23)
 Bobby Bhonsle as Anup Khanna (Episode 21 to Episode 24)
 Anjali Mukhi as Nisha Ajay Khanna (Episode 21 to Episode 24)
 Tabrez Khan as Shekhar (Episode 23 & Episode 24)
 Manish Goel as Shekhar Gupta (Episode 26 to Episode 28)
 Shabnam Mishra as Shalini (Episode 27 & Episode 28)
 Payal Nair (Episode 29 to Episode 32)

References

Sony SAB original programming
Indian crime television series
2001 Indian television series debuts
Fictional portrayals of police departments in India